Chris "The Greek" Panaghi is an American DJ, producer and remixer based in Long Island, New York, United States. He performs in the electronic music genre with remixes spanning electronic dance, trance and house music and has remixed for artists including: Michael Jackson, Gloria Estefan, Celine Dion, Jessica Simpson, Celia Cruz, Jon Secada, Marc Anthony, Aqua and Yoko Ono.
 His studio work has been described as incorporating "True-to-the-vocal, pop-oriented remixes and harder, progressive house tracks".

Panaghi has principally performed in the United States, but has also developed a fan base in Europe, principally in France, Germany, Greece, Netherlands and the UK.

Early career
Chris Panaghi's career began in high school at the age of 15, when he started experimenting with record turntables. Within a couple of years he had begun to perform as a mobile DJ and in local bars in his hometown of Valley Stream, Long Island. By the time he was 18 he had progressed to performing in local clubs, such as Malibu, J. Sprats, Metro 700, DNA and Zachary's. He later began playing clubs in the New York Tri-state area, including Manhattan and Queens before travelling further in the U.S. (South Beach, Miami) and internationally (Greece, Mexico, Netherlands and the UK). By this time Panaghi had also built a small studio in Long Island and brought in other musicians and staff to make records.

Educational background
The producer studied business management and marketing at Adelphi University, graduating in 1996 with a Bachelor of Arts in marketing. I

Radio and print
Chris Panaghi has co-hosted "The Island Underground" with B-Man (Brian Rosenberg), a syndicated radio show broadcast on Garden City-based WLIR. He has also featured or guest DJ'd on stations such as Sirius XM Radio, XM Radio, 88.7 WRHU.

In addition to broadcasting, Panaghi has been a Billboard reporter and has written for DMA (Dance Music Authority), Streetsounds and Prime Cuts U.K.

Chart success
Panaghi has achieved chart success with a number of singles achieving gold and/or platinum status. Seven songs from his 2008 album  charted in the Billboard Dance Club Play Chart, with two breaking the top 5 – 'The Feeling' and 'The Time'. He has also achieved BillBoard chart success with 'As Good as Sin' featuring Sophia Cruz.

He has produced remixes for a range of artists including Michael Jackson, Gloria Estefan, Celine Dion, Jessica Simpson, Celia Cruz, Jon Secada, Marc Anthony, Aqua and Yoko Ono. In 2005 he was commissioned by Sony (Greece) to remix 'My Number One', which had won the Eurovision Song Contest for Greece. The remix achieved European success for the release, going gold and reaching number one in both Greece and Sweden.

International
While best known in the U.S. Panaghi has also performed in Europe, growing a fan base in France, Germany, Greece, Netherlands and the UK and has been described as a 'key player in the field' by USA Greek Reporter.

Remixing technique
Chris Panaghi had solo responsibility for remixes and original productions for artists such as Gloria Estefan and Michael Jackson through DJG Records. Other artists he has worked with include: Jessica Simpson, Celia Cruz, Jon Secada, Marc Anthony, Aqua and Yoko Ono. Panaghi has additionally remixed for Sony in Greece and ZYX in Germany.

Chris also runs the record label Amathus Music, a label that has produced artists such as Laylah, Kamarova and Keven Maroda. Alongside this, it has produced the compilation series 50 Techno Club Tracks – Vol.1 and Vol.2, which broke the top 100 iTunes Dance Charts worldwide.

Select discography

Albums
2008
"Hands Up: Anthems"
"Now's the Time", DJG Records
"You Just Don't Get It", DJG Records
"My Life", DJG Records
2007
"The Essentials", Sub Deep Haven
"Pump", Sub Deep Haven
2006
"The Time", DJG Records
"Working the Mix", Water Music Dance
2004
"Tranceflux", Benz-Street
2002
"Live in the Mix with DJ Chris "The Greek" Panaghi", 24-7 / Artemis Records
"Thump'n Freestyle Quick Mixx, Vol.3", Thump Records
2001
"Peak Hour, Vol.2", Saifam
2000
"Peak Hour", Megahit Records
1998
"You're in My House", Aureus Records

Compilations
1999
"Dance Floor Rituals", Waako Records

Singles and EPs

2008
"My Life", DJG Records
"Movin' On", DJG Records
"My House Is Your House", DJG Records
"The Feeling", DJG Records
"The Time", DJG Records
"Time Will Never (Fade Me Away)", DJG Records
"You Just Don't Get It", DJG Records
2006'
"Pump",
2005
"The Feeling", DJG Records
"As Good As Sin", DJG Records
"I Wanna Feel The Music", DJG Records
"With You", Amathus Music
"Movin' On", DJG Records
2000	
"Get Up"
'"Essential EP"'
1997
"Funky", ZYX Music
"Funky (Remixes)"

Selected remixes

2010
"Outta Control", Laylah
2006
"My Number One", Helena Paparizou
2005
"Give Peace A Chance", Yoko Ono
"My Number One", Helena Paparizou
2004
"The Air That I Breathe", Judy Torres
"This Is Reina", Reina
2002
"A New Day Has Come", Celine Dion
1999
"Oye", Gloria Estefan
1997
"Is It Scary", Michael Jackson

References

1972 births
American dance musicians
American house musicians
American keyboardists
American people of Greek descent
Living people
Record producers from New York (state)
Remixers